Aghdasieh (also spelled Aghdassieh) is a neighborhood in the north of Tehran, Iran centered on Aghdasieh Street.

See also

Neighbourhoods in Tehran
Streets in Tehran